Huron College may refer to:

 Huron University College in London, Ontario, known as "Huron College" (1863–2000)
 Huron University (1883–2005) in Huron, South Dakota, known as "Huron College" (1897–1989)

See also
 Huron University (disambiguation)
 College (disambiguation)
 Huron (disambiguation)